Pterotaenia peruana is a species of ulidiid or picture-winged fly in the genus Pterotaenia of the family Ulidiidae.

Distribution
Peru, Chile.

References

Ulidiidae
Diptera of South America
Fauna of Peru
Fauna of Chile
Taxa named by John Russell Malloch
Insects described in 1933